Local Food Hero is a competition to find, celebrate and award Britain's best independent food businesses - those who champions local produce with a strong connection to their community. In 2009, the competition was hosted by the television programme Market Kitchen, on the channel Good Food. Businesses from 10 regions in the UK were nominated and voted for by the public on the Good Food Channel website. After voting ended, the 10 businesses from each region with the most votes were assessed by a selection panel. The panel shortlisted three businesses from each region.

Presenters Matt Tebbutt and Matthew Fort visited the shortlisted businesses for a feature on Market Kitchen. A panel of expert judges then chose one winner from each the 10 regions, all of whom appeared as guests on Market Kitchen. The overall national winner for 2009 was The Dinner Ladies who received a trophy and £5000.

In previous years, celebrity chefs Gary Rhodes, Ollie Rowe and Rosemary Shrager presented and judged the competition as a stand-alone show.

Changes
The first season would have a celebrity "regional scout" visit eight businesses in their locality, who they would talk to and sample their produce. The scout would then choose their favourite three who would then go on to the regional finals, where the three chefs and judges would pick their first second and third placed contestant, the winner of the regional heat would then be chosen by combining the judge's and public votes.

The second season saw a slight change where five finalists are chosen to go on the regional finals.

Series 1 (2006)

Regional finalists and winner 
The following are the three regional finalists for 2006:

East Anglia
East Anglia's regional scout was Danny Boome.
 The Letheringsett Watermill (regional winner)
 Samphire
 Rainbow Café
 Byfords Café & Deli
 DJ Barnard Meats
 Alder Carr Farm
 The Galley Restaurant
 The Lavender House

London
London's regional scout was celebrity chef, Aldo Zilli
 Lighthouse Bakery (regional winner)
 Kelly's Organic Foods
 Crumpet
 The Easton
 Hope & Greenwood
 The Ginger Pig
 Duke of Cambridge
 Mortimer and Bennett

Midlands
The regional scout for the Midlands was Terri Dwyer.
 The Pink Pig (regional winner)
 The Fighting Cocks
 Deli on the Square
 Maison Mayci
 The Wellington
 Berrys Coffee House
 Littleover Apiaries
 The Handmade Scotch Egg Company

North East
The regional scout for the North East was Brian Turner.
 Northumbrian Quality Meats (regional winner)
 Ryebury of Helmsley
 The Whitby Catch
 Helmsley Walled Garden
 Langthorne's Buffalo Produce
 Carroll's Heritage Potatoes
 The Comfort Food Company
 Greens of Whitby

North West
Edwina Currie stepped up as regional scout for the North West.
 The Café @ Green Pavilion (regional winner)
 The Weavers Shed Restaurant
 Mrs Kirkhams Lancashire Cheese
 The Grasmere Ginger Bread Shop
 The Whale Tail Café
 Artisan Café
 The Real Lancashire Black Pudding Company
 Holly Tree Farm Shop

Northern Ireland
Paul Rankin was the regional scout for the Northern Ireland area.
 Yellow Door Deli (regional winner)
 O’Doherty Butchers
 Helen Bay Organics
 The Bay Tree
 The Duke Restaurant
 Cloughbane Farm
 Tully Meadows Luxury Jersey Ice Cream
 Pretty Mary's

Scotland
The scout for Scotland was Kaye Adams.
 Original Smokies from Arbroath (regional winner)
 Ferry Fish
 Heart Buchanon Café
 The Store
 Farm House Kitchen
 The Water Tower
 McPhies Bakery
 Fletcher Fine Foods

South East
Sarah Cawood scouted the South East region.
 The Crooked Billet (regional winner)
 Farm Fresh Express Limited
 Dairy Barn Farm Shop
 The Vaults And Garden Café
 The Royal Standard
 Spice Merchant
 The Real Jam and Chutney Co.
 Hammer Trout Farm and Smokery

South West
Michael Caines chose the eight finalists from the South West.
 Roswell Fruit and Veg
 Country Cheeses
 Montgomery Cheese
 Combe House Hotel and Restaurant
 The Dartmoor Inn
 Jekka's Herb Farm
 Riverford Organic Vegetables Limited
 Quartier Vert

Wales
The scout for the Wales region was Angela Gray.
 Organic Zone (regional winner)
 Pilgrim's Tea Rooms
 The Harbour Master
 The Treehouse
 Castell  Deudraeth Bar and Grill
 The Barn at Brynich
 Xtreme Organix
 Frantastic Crepes

Overall Winner
The overall winner for Local Food Hero 2006 was the Letheringsett Watermill

Series 2 (2007)
The overall winner for Local Food Hero 2007 was the Daisy's Farm Fresh Milk

Series 3 (2008)
The overall winner Local Food Hero 2008 was Richard Ord from Colman's Fish and Chip Shop in South Shields.

Market Kitchen (2009)
The overall winner Local Food Hero 2009 was The Dinner Ladies, school caterers from Wilmslow in Cheshire.

References

External links
 The official Local Food Hero homepage on the UKTV Food web site.
 Food at UKTV.co.uk
 The TV Room looks at presentation/branding on the UKTV channels

2006 British television series debuts
British cooking television shows
2000s British cooking television series